Mocis ancilla is a species of moth of the family Erebidae. It is found in Russia (south-eastern Siberia, Ussuri, Primorje), China (Shaanxi), Korea and Japan (Honshu).

References

Moths described in 1913
Moths of Asia
Moths of Japan
Moths of Korea
ancilla